Watcharaphon Vongsa (born 15 October 1990) is a Thai boccia player who represented Thailand at the 2012, 2016 and 2020 Summer Paralympics, and won four Paralympic gold medals in total.

References

External links
 
 

Watcharaphon Vongsa
Watcharaphon Vongsa
Watcharaphon Vongsa
Medalists at the 2012 Summer Paralympics
Medalists at the 2016 Summer Paralympics
Medalists at the 2020 Summer Paralympics
Paralympic medalists in boccia
Boccia players at the 2012 Summer Paralympics
Boccia players at the 2016 Summer Paralympics
Boccia players at the 2020 Summer Paralympics
Sportspeople with cerebral palsy
Watcharaphon Vongsa
1990 births
Living people
Watcharaphon Vongsa